During the Spanish Civil War Catholic people faced persecution from the Republican faction of the war, in part due to their support of the nationalists and the recently abolished monarchy. The Catholic Church venerates them as martyrs. More than 6,800 clerics and other Catholic people were killed in what has been dubbed the Red Terror. As of October 2022, 2,107 Spanish martyrs have been beatified; 11 of them being canonized. For some 2,000 additional martyrs, the beatification process is underway

History
During the Spanish Civil War of 1936–1939, and especially in the early months of the conflict, individual clergymen were executed while entire religious communities were persecuted, leading to a death toll of 13 bishops, 4,172 diocesan priests and seminarians, 2,364 monks and friars and 283 nuns, for a total of 6,832 clerical victims, as part of what is referred to as Spain's Red Terror.

Pope John Paul II

Pope John Paul II beatified 473 martyrs in the years 1987, 1989, 1990, 1992, 1993, 1995,  1997 and 2001. Some  233 executed clergy were beatified by John Paul II on 11 March 2001. In 1999 he also canonized a Christian Brother and the nine Martyrs of Turon, the first group of Spanish Civil War martyrs to reach sainthood. Regarding the  selection of Candidates, Archbishop Edward Novack from the Congregation of Saints explained  in an interview with L'Osservatore Romano: "Ideologies such as Nazism or Communism serve as a context of martyrdom, but in the foreground the person stands out with his conduct, and, case by case, it is important that the people among whom the person lived should affirm and recognize his fame as a martyr and then pray to him, obtaining graces. It is not so much ideologies that concern us, as the sense of faith of the People of God, who judge  the person's behavior."

Pope Benedict XVI

Benedict XVI beatified 530 martyrs in the years 2005, 2007, 2010 and 2011, with the biggest being the 498 Spanish martyrs in October 2007, in the largest beatification ceremony in the history of the Catholic Church.  In this group of people,  the Vatican has not included all Spanish  martyrs, nor any of the 16 priests who were executed by the nationalist side in the first years of the war. This decision has caused numerous criticisms from surviving family members and several political organisations in Spain.

The beatification recognized the extraordinary fate and often brutal death of the persons involved. Some have criticized the beatifications as dishonoring non-clergy who were also killed in the war, and as being an attempt to draw attention away from the church's support of Franco (some quarters of the Church called the Nationalist cause a "crusade").  Within Spain, the Civil War still raises high emotions. The act of beatification has also coincided in time with the debate on the Law of Historical Memory (about the treatment of the victims of the war and its aftermath) promoted by the Spanish Government.

Responding to the criticism, the Vatican has described the  October 2007 beatifications as relating to personal virtues and holiness, not ideology. They are  not about "resentment but ... reconciliation".  The Spanish government has supported the beatifications, sending Foreign Minister Miguel Ángel Moratinos to attend the ceremony.
Among those present was Juan Andrés Torres Mora, a relative of one of the martyrs and the Spanish MP who had debated the memory law for PSOE
.

The October 2007 beatifications have brought the number of martyred persons beatified by the Church to 977, eleven of whom have been canonized as saints. Because of the extent of the persecution, many more cases could be proposed; as many as 10,000 according to Catholic Church sources. The process for beatification has already been initiated for about 2,000 people.

At 28 October 2007 beatifications, Pope Benedict underscored the call to sanctity for all Christians, saying it was "realistic possibility for the entire Christian people".  He also noted, "This martyrdom in ordinary life is an important witness in today's secularized society."

Pope Francis

Pope Francis beatified 522 martyrs on 13 October 2013, at Tarragona, Spain; among them was Eugenio Sanz-Orozco Mortera from Manila, Philippines, who became the first Filipino martyr of the Spanish Civil War. He also approved additional beatifications for Spanish martyrs that took place for a priest on 1 November 2014 as well as two sets of group martyrs on both 5 September 2015 and 3 October 2015. The pope also approved the beatification of 26 Capuchin martyrs, which took place on 21 November 2015. The beatification for Valentín Palencia Marquina and his four companions took place on 23 April 2016 in Burgos. The beatification for Genaro Fueyo Castañon and his three companions was celebrated in Oviedo on 8 October 2016 and the beatification of José Antón Gómez and 3 companions was celebrated in Madrid on 29 October 2016. The 114 Almerian martyrs were beatified on 25 March 2017, and Antonio Arribas Hortigüela and his six companions were beatified on 6 May 2017 in Girona. The beatification of Mateo Casals Mas & 108 companions were beatified in Barcelona on 21 October 2017 and Vicenç Queralt Lloret & 20 companions as well as José Maria Fernández Sánchez & 38 companions were beatified in Madrid on 11 November 2017. The beatification of Teodoro Illera del Olmo & 15 Companions was held on 10 November 2018. The beatification of Ángel Cuartas Cristobal and his 8 companions was held in Oviedo on 9 March 2019 while María Isabel Lacaba Andia and her 13 companions were beatified in Madrid on 22 June 2019. María Pilar Gullón Yturriaga and 2 companions was beatified in Astorga on 29 May 2021. The beatification of Juan Elías Medina and 126 companions will be held in Córdoba on 16 October 2021, Francisco Cástor Sojo López and 3 companions in Tortosa on 30 October 2021 Benet Domènech Bonet & 2 companions in Barcelona on 6 November 2021 The beatifications of Cayetano Giménez Martín & 15 Companions in Granada on 26 February 2022, Angel Marina Álvarez & 19 Companions, Isabel Sánchez Romero, Juan Aguilar Donis & 5 Companions in Almería on 18 June 2022 and Vicente Nicasio Renuncio Toribio & 11 Companions in Madrid on 22 October 2022.

Individual cases

Martyrs of Turon

The martyrs of Turon were a group of eight De La Salle Brothers, and the Passionist priest who was with them, who were executed by striking miners at Turon in October 1934. This was nearly two years before the outbreak of the civil war, therefore they shall not be regarded as martyrs of the Spanish Civil War. They were beatified by Pope John Paul II on 29 April 1990, and were canonized by him on 21 November 1999.

Innocencio of Mary Immaculate

Saint Innocencio of Mary Immaculate, born Emanuele Canoura Arnau, was a member of the Passionist Congregation and martyr of the Spanish Civil War. Born on 10 March 1887 in Santa Cecelia del Valle de Oro in Galicia, Spain, he died at Turon, with his eight companions, on 9 October 1934. He was beatified on 29 April 1990 and was canonized by Pope John Paul II on 21 November 1999.

Jaime Hilario Barbal

Jaime Hilario Barbal, born Manuel Barbal Cosán, was raised in a pious and hardworking family near the Pyrenees mountains. Entered the seminary at age 12, but when his hearing began to fail in his teens, he was sent home. Joined the Brothers of the Christian Schools at age 19, entering the novitiate on 24 February 1917 at Irun, Spain, taking the name Jaime Hilario. Exceptional teacher and catechist, he believed strongly in the value of universal education, especially for the poor. However, his hearing problems grew worse, and in the early 1930s, he was forced to retire from teaching, and began work in the garden at the La Salle house at San Jose, Tarragona, Spain. Imprisoned in July 1936 at Mollerosa, Spain when the Spanish Civil War broke out and religious people were swept from the street. Transferred to Tarragona in December, then confined on a prison ship with some other religious. Convicted on 15 January 1937 of being a Christian Brother. Two rounds of volley fire from a firing squad did not kill him, possibly because some of the soldiers intentionally shot wide; their commander then murdered Jaime with five shots at close range. First of the 97 La Salle Brothers killed in Catalonia, Spain during the Spanish Civil War to be recognized as a martyr. He was beatified on 29 April 1990, and was canonized by Pope John Paul II on 21 November 1999.

Pedro Poveda

He was a priest, the founder of the Teresian Association and a Martyr of the Spanish civil war. He was beatified on 10 October 1993 and canonized on 4 May 2003.

Passionist Martyrs of Daimiel

They  were a group of priests and brothers of the Passionist Congregation killed by Republican forces during the Spanish Civil War. They were beatified by Pope John Paul II on 1 October 1989.  Eyewitnesses reported that all of the Passionists had forgiven their murderers before they died. A witness to the murder of Father Niceforo reported that after being shot the priest turned his eyes to heaven then turned and smiled at his murderers. At this point one of them, now more infuriated than ever, shouted:  

What, are you still smiling? 

With that he shot him at point blank range.

Eugenio Sanz-Orozco Mortera

Eugenio Sanz-Orozco Mortera (Jose Maria of Manila) was born on 5 September 1880 in Manila, Philippines. He was a Franciscan Capuchin priest. He died a martyr on 17 August 1936, in Madrid, Spain, during the Spanish civil war. He is venerated in the Catholic Church, which celebrates his feast on 6 November. He was beatified on 13 October 2013.

Bartolomé Blanco Márquez

Bartolomé Blanco Márquez was born in Cordoba, Spain in 1914. He was arrested as a Catholic leader—he was the secretary of Catholic Action and a delegate to the Catholic Syndicates—on 18 August 1936. He was executed on 2 October 1936, at age 21, while he cried out, "Long live Christ the King!"  Born in Pozoblanco 25 November 1914, Bartolome was orphaned as a child, and raised by family with whom he worked.  He was an excellent student, studying under the tutelage of the Salesians.

Victoria Díez Bustos de Molina

She was a religious, the member of the same congregation and also a Martyr of the Spanish civil war. She was beatified on 10 October 1993.

Pedro Asúa Mendía

Pedro was educated by Jesuits.  Trained as an architect, graduating in 1915. he worked on schools, churches and houses for religious.  He was ordained priest in the diocese of Vitoria, Spain in 1924.  He was executed on 29 August 1936.  He was beatified on 1 November 2014.

Mariano Mullerat i Soldevila

Mariano was a Spanish Roman Catholic doctor who also served as the mayor for Arbeca from 1924 until March 1930. He died on 13 August 1936. He was beatified on 23 March 2019.

Joan Roig i Diggle

Joan was a young layperson of the Archdiocese of Barcelona. He died on 11 September 1936. He was beatified on 7 November 2020.

Isabel Sánchez Romero

Isabel was a religious from the Dominican Order. She died on 15 February 1937. She was set to be beatified on 19 September 2020 but it was postponed to 18 June 2022 due to COVID-19 pandemic.

List of martyrs

Beatification

(*) means they are Canonized.

Canonization

Background
During the nineteenth and the twentieth centuries, the Catholic Church in Spain supported and was strongly supported by and associated with the Spanish monarchy. The Second Spanish Republic saw an alternation of leftist and conservative coalition governments between 1931 and 1936. Amidst the disorder caused by the military coup of July 1936, many supporters of the Republican government pointed their weapons against individuals they considered local reactionaries, including priests and nuns.

A paradoxic case for foreign Catholics was that of the Basque Nationalist Party, at the time a Catholic party from the Basque areas, who after some hesitation supported the Republican government in exchange for an autonomous government in the Basque Country.  Although virtually every other group on the Republican side was involved in the anticlerical persecution, the Basques did not play a part.  The Vatican diplomacy tried to orient them to the National side, explicitly supported by Cardinal Isidro Goma y Tomas, but the BNP feared the centralism of the Nationals. Some Catalan nationalists also found themselves in the same situation, such as members of de Unió Democràtica de Catalunya party whose most relevant leader, Manuel Carrasco i Formiguera was killed by the Nationalists in Burgos in 1938.

Controversy
A number of controversies have arisen around the beatification of some of these clerics. Some objectors oppose the notion of these priests being killed for mere religious hatred and, while not excusing their brutal murders, putting them in the context of the historical moment. Others question the appropriateness of beatification for some individuals who have less than saintly backgrounds. A third objection is the perceived partiality of the Church, where victims of the left have been proposed for beatification, while victims of the right have been ignored.

Of the first objection, one of the most notable cases has centered on Cruz Laplana y Laguna, Bishop of Cuenca, a well-known supporter of the monarchist regime. After the proclamation of the Second Republic he carried out a number of right-wing political campaigns throughout the province, and had established close contacts with military officials such as General Joaquín Fanjul, a supporter of the Nationalist rebellion. Laplana y Laguna was described by his biographer as "supreme advisor" to the general, as well as being closely involved with the Falange. In 1936 he personally endorsed Falangista leader José Antonio Primo de Rivera as a candidate in the 1936 local elections. When the Nationalist uprising in Cuenca failed, Laplana y Lagun was arrested by Republican militiamen for treason. He was tried for conspiring against the Republican government and executed on 8 August.

Another is Fulgencio Martínez, a priest in the village of La Paca in Murcia, who was shot after the uprising, who was reported by many locals to be closely allied to the local landowners. Over several days before the uprising, Father Fulgencio met with these landowners in the village casino—the hub of social life for the local elites in rural Spain—to organize support for the rebellion. He offered guns and money to anyone who would join an improvised militia. On 18 July, the day of the uprising, Father Fulgencio was among the persons who went through the village streets on lorries, rallying support for the uprising with shouts of "Viva el Ejército!" ("Long live the Army") and "Viva General Queipo de Llano!"

Public statements by some of these clerics have also been widely publicised as a form of criticism against their beatification. Rigoberto Domenech, Archbishop of Zaragoza, declared publicly on 11 August 1936 that the military uprising was to be supported, and its defensive actions approved, because "it is not done in the service of anarchy, but in the benefit of order, fatherland, and religion" in response to the Red Terror. Another statement was that given in November 1938 by Leopoldo Eijo Garay, Bishop of Madrid-Alcalá, regarding a possible truce between Republican and rebel forces: "To tolerate democratic liberalism... would be to betray the martyrs."

Of the second, the controversy surrounding the beatification of Augustinian Friar Gabino Olaso Zabala, listed as a companion of Avelino Rodriguez Alonso, concerns his previous life. Friar Zabala was martyred during the Civil War and was beatified. Attention was called to the fact that Fr. Olaso had been a missionary in the Philippines during the Katipunan rebellion against Spanish rule, and had been accused of torturing Friar Mariano Dacanay, an alleged rebel sympathizer. However this objection ignores the Church proclamation that even sinners can repent and turn into saints, such as in the case of Augustine of Hippo. It also misunderstands the nature of a cause for martyrdom, where the primary factor is the person's death due to religious hatred of the faith, rather than the saintliness of his previous life.

The third objection refers to the Church's attitude to victims of Nationalist repression. Regarding the attitude of the Vatican, Manuel Montero, lecturer of the University of the Basque Country commented on 6 May 2007:

While much of Republican Spain was anti-clerical in sentiment, the Basque region, which also supported the Republic, was not; the clergy of the region stood against the Nationalist coup, and suffered accordingly. At least 16 Basque nationalist priests (among them the arch-priest of Mondragón) were killed by the Nationalists, and hundreds more were imprisoned or deported. This included several priests who tried to halt the killings. To date, the Vatican has failed to consider these clergy as martyrs of the Spanish Civil War, since they were not murdered in hatred of the Faith (odium fidei), a prerequisite for the recognition of martyrdom.

See also
Boxer Rebellion
Martyrs of China
Korean Martyrs 
Metrophanes,  Chi Sung, New Martyr 
China Martyrs of 1900 
Martyr Saints of China 
Saint Innocencio of Mary Immaculate
The Martyrs of Daimiel
Blessed Bartolome Blanco Marquez, cooperator of the Salesian Fathers
Suppression of Freemasonry (Spain)
Martyrs of the Cristero War
Drina Martyrs
233 Spanish Martyrs
498 Spanish Martyrs
International Day of Prayer for the Persecuted Church

References

External links
Martyrs of Religious Persecution During the Spanish Civil War (first of sixty pages of martyrs with photos)
The Persecution of Catholics in the Spanish Civil War
From ZENIT news service article "A Martyr's Letter to His Girlfriend"
Ariticle from Catholic News Service 

20th-century venerated Christians
Spanish beatified people
Beatifications by Pope Benedict XVI
Roman Catholic child saints
Executed children
History of Catholicism in Spain
Lists of Christian martyrs
Martyred groups
Martyred Roman Catholic priests
Religious persecution
Spanish Roman Catholic saints
Lists of saints
Beatifications by Pope John Paul II
Beatifications by Pope Francis